Emma Cousin (born 8 March 1986 in Yorkshire) is a British artist.

Life
Cousin grew up in Yorkshire. In 2007, she graduated from the Ruskin School of Fine Art at the University of Oxford. Today Cousin lives and works in London.

A mixture of geometric and figurative elements in a bold colour palette is typical of Cousin's style. Her paintings often feature depictions of legs. Her works are regularly on display in different galleries, such as in Transition Gallery and in the House of St Barnabas in London. Her paintings have been shown in various group exhibitions but also in solo shows, the most recent one being Leg Up at Lewisham Arthouse in London. In addition to making art, Cousin teaches at various institutions, including Milton Keynes Arts Centre and Sotheby's Institute of Art, London.

Exhibitions (selection) 

 2018: Leg Up at Lewisham Art House
 2015: Lucy in the Sky, group show, Transition Gallery, London
 2015: Seven Painters, group show, Arcade Gallery, Cardiff and London
 2016: The ING Discerning Eye Exhibition, group show, Mall Galleries, London
 2017: Make a Mark, group show, Arthouse1 Gallery, London
 2017: I Really Miss You Until You’re Here, group show, White Conduit Projects, London
 2017: Silk Room, group show, The House of St Barnabas, London
 2017: Mudhook, Tintype Gallery, London
 2017: Aids to Living, solo show, DOLPH Projects, London
 2017: Painting Vol.1, group show, CGK Gallery, Copenhagen
 2018: Survey, touring show, Jerwood Visual Arts, London, Cardiff, Liverpool and Newcastle
 2018: Mardy, group show, Edel Assanti, London
 2018: Leg Up, solo show, Lewisham Arthouse, London
 2018: Wasp, group show, Hannah Barry Gallery, London

Exhibitions as curator 
 2014: The British Line, group show, Robin Katz Gallery, London
 2016: Its Offal, ArtHouse1, London
 2015—2017: Bread and Jam, a series of 7 exhibitions, London

Awards (selection) 
 2016: Marmite Painting Prize
 2018: Jerwood Visual Arts Survey award

References

External links 
 
 interview in FAD Magazine
 interview in Elephant.art Magazine

1986 births
Living people
21st-century English painters
21st-century English women artists
Alumni of the Ruskin School of Art
Artists from Yorkshire
English contemporary artists
English women painters